Benjamin Khoh (born 14 January 1992) is a Singaporean socialite, actor, lawyer and model.



Early life and education
Benjamin Khoh was born January 14, 1992, in Singapore. His family is in the business of gourmet food distribution. He attended the University of Nottingham and graduated with a Bachelor of Laws with Honours.

Career

Social scene and modelling
Benjamin started pageantry at his teen years and won many titles. In year 2012, he was scouted on the streets by Mediacorp which he emerged as the winner of "rising male star" on the reality TV program through public voting. He was later scouted again to join Manhunt Singapore 2013 as one of the 12 finalist and sparked national controversy. He made headlines in Singapore after the announcement of the finalists, for being "pale and slim pretty boy" unlike the other contestants.

He later went on to become the first Asian model for Coldwear, regional winter wear retailer and graced many editorial spreads for Springfield, Dolce & Gabbana, Lanvin, Givenchy, Denizen, Levis, Celio, DKNY JEANS, Armani Exchange and Zara.

Benjamin appeared in Ming Bridges's music video for her song “Summertime Love”.

Benjamin was featured "(Star) On the Rise" by Singapore Tatler magazine in 2015 upon announcing his collaboration with songwriter and producer Lee Wei Song on his first mandopop single.

In 2016, Benjamin was signed on by Mediacorp's production team for 3 TV series, one of which was "The Gentlemen" co-starring Aloysious Pang and Carrie Wong. He later dropped out of the contract in the midst of filming citing personal reasons.

Publication
Benjamin contributed an article to the Singapore Law Review 2020 where he suggested that the Attorney-General of Singapore should consider publishing prosecutorial guidelines calling for transparency and accountability. Its patron, former Chief Justice of Singapore Chan Sek Keong commented that the article raised interesting constitutional questions on whether Parliament of Singapore had the power to enact legislation to limit the powers of the Attorney-General.

TheSkinBrand
In 2020, Benjamin founded TheSkinBrand, a Singapore based beauty company specializing in skin care products. He was inspired to launch his own skincare line due to his skincare struggles whilst studying in England where the weather was often cold and  dry.

Awards and nominations

Authored articles 
Benjamin Khoh (2020). The Publication of Prosecutorial Guidelines and Duties; A Necessary 'Evil' of the Criminal Justice System in Singapore. Singapore Comparative Law Review.

References

External links
 

Singaporean socialites
Singaporean male models
1992 births
Participants in Singaporean reality television series
Singaporean people of Chinese descent
Living people
People associated with the University of Nottingham
Nottingham-related lists